Terry Copley may refer to:

 Terence Copley, British author
 Teri Copley, American actress